Gordon Lewis is an Irish–British film producer and author. He is known to have produce numerous music videos for Soft Cell, The Pretenders, Queen, John Lydon, The Cure, Talk Talk, Paul Weller, Roger Taylor, George Michael, Depeche Mode, Daryl Hall & John Oates, Neil Young, Elton John, and David Bowie. His recently produced award-winning short films Secret Child (2018) and Mical (2020) has received rave reviews at the international film festivals. Lewis wrote his debut book, Secret Child, in 2015, released by HarperCollins and became a Sunday Times bestseller. He has two books scheduled to be release in 2022, Soho Hustle and Little People.

Early life 
Born in Dublin, Ireland, Lewis spent his childhood with his mother Cathleen at Regina Coeli, a haven for over 150 mothers and their children. Lewis move to London and left school at 15, and he started as a messenger at London Weekend Television (LWT).

Lewis paid homage to his late mother by writing his first book, Secret Child, which became a Sunday Times bestseller. He then produced an award-winning short film based on the book of the same name, Secret Child, with director Yewweng Ho and cinematographer Darius Shu, which won over 20 international film festival awards from the Oscars-qualifying HollyShorts Film Festival in Los Angeles to winning Best Debut Film at the New Renaissance Film Festival in London.

Career 
In 1970, Lewis left London Weekend Television and joined one of the first independent production companies, Mike Mansfield Productions in London at the age of 21, which later he became a partner. The company specialised in music programs for television. The company sold The Supersonic Music series which ran for four seasons worldwide. The music acts featured were Rod Stewart, Elton John, Sex Pistols, ELO, Bonnie Tyler, Status Quo and many more. The company was also a pioneer for making music videos and television music shows, such as Jukebox with Twiggy as presenter.

In 1980, he set Gordon Lewis Organisation (GLO), which first deal was a co-production deal with ITV, 'Where Were You TV series. GLO sold the format of 'Where Were You?' to ABC network in USA who made two series.
GLO moved into music videos with offices in London and Los Angeles for the new MTV network. Some more of the music acts Lewis' produced were Soft Cell, Bananarama, Terence Trent D'arby, The Pretenders, Queen, John Lydon, Dead or Alive, ABC, Men Without Hats, Bryan Ferry, The The / Matt Johnson, Mel and Kim, The Cure, Talk Talk, Paul Weller, Roger Taylor, George Michael, Depeche Mode, Daryl Hall & John Oates, Neil Young, and David Bowie. Lewis also produced the film, 'The Cure in Orange' , for cinema.

Lewis then moved into making commercials off the back of the success of the music videos. The first commercial made by GLO was for Tuborg Lager with the music from The Art of Noise. The commercial won nine International awards. GLO went into co-production deal for commercials with Virgin Media USA. Directors who has worked for GLO were Tim Pope, Peter Care, Duncan Gibbons, Mark Romanek, Vaughan Arnell and Jake Scott.

In 1987, he moved into other businesses and spotted the opportunity of opening the first stylish café bars in the UK and turned London Soho gay with became known as The Sultan of Soho.

In 2015, he wrote his first book, Secret Child, in homage to his late mother and it became a Sunday Times bestseller and was released by HarperCollins.

In 2017, he produced a short film, Secret Child, based on his bestselling book with director Yewweng Ho and cinematographer Darius Shu and was later released on YouTube with over 450k+ views.

In 2019, he produced an award-winning short film on dyslexia called Mical, based on the true story of Pat and Mike Jones, reuniting once again with director Yewweng Ho and cinematographer Darius Shu, now with over 1.6 million views on YouTube and also streaming on Amazon Prime Video. The idea behind the film was to spread the awareness about dyslexia.

In 2020, Lewis released the follow up book to Secret Child called Secret to Sultan which focuses on Lewis' career, how he worked hard to develop a very successful Production business before taking on a new challenge of creating the first London gay village as a part of the Soho nightclub scene, which lead to his favourite nickname and inspiration for the title "The Sultan of Soho".

In 2021, Lewis has written two more books, Soho Hustle and Little People scheduled for release in 2022. Soho Hustle is currently in discussion to be made into a television series and Little People is in talks to be made into an animated film.

 Filmography 

 Music videos Some of the music videos produced by Gordon Lewis'

Films

Books 
 Secret Child (2015)
 Secret to Sultan (2020)

References

External links 
 
 Official Website

British film producers
Irish film producers
Year of birth missing (living people)
Living people